Dolnja Bistrica is a village in the Municipality of Črenšovci in the Prekmurje region of northeastern Slovenia.

References

External links 
Dolnja Bistrica on Geopedia

Populated places in the Municipality of Črenšovci